The 2023 AFL season is the 127th season of the Australian Football League (AFL), the highest level senior men's Australian rules football competition in Australia, which was known as the Victorian Football League until 1989. The season will feature eighteen clubs and is scheduled to run from 16 March until 30 September, comprising a 23-game home-and-away season, the longest in league history, followed by a finals series featuring the top eight clubs.

Background
The fixture was extended to 23 matches per club, the longest in history. This was to accommodate the introduction of the 'Gather Round' – known in full as 'Gather Round... a festival of footy' – a special round featuring all eighteen clubs playing in the same city; this was modelled on the Magic Round, which the National Rugby League had scheduled annually since 2019. South Australia won the bid for the event, beating a bid from New South Wales. Six of the nine matches will take place at Adelaide Oval, with Norwood Oval (two) and Summit Oval, Mount Barker (one) each to host their first AFL matches; and the Saturday and Sunday fixtures at Adelaide Oval were staged as ticketed double-headers, with a single ticket granting access to both matches. For all practical purposes – including distribution of gate receipts, benefits and reserved seating for club members, and clash uniform colours – the round is considered a neutral AFL event, and clubs will be considered neither home nor away, meaning each club still plays eleven home games and eleven away games for the season (clubs below are listed alphabetically). All club members were given priority access to Gather Round tickets.

The following rule changes were made for the 2023 season:

 The number of field umpires in control of each match was increased from three to four.
 The medical substitute position, which had been introduced in 2021, was replaced with a general substitute. Prior rules had allowed for the medical substitute to be used only if the player being substituted from the had a medical reason to do so, but this stipulation was removed allowing for the substitute to be used for any reason.

Coach appointments

Club leadership

Pre-season
All starting times are local time. Source: afl.com.au

Home-and-away season
All starting times are local time. Source: AFL Tables

Round 1

Round 2

Round 3

Round 4

Round 5

Round 6

Round 7

Round 8

Round 9

Round 10

Round 11

Round 12

Round 13

Round 14

Round 15

Round 16

Round 17

Round 18

Round 19

Round 20

Round 21

Round 22

Round 23

Round 24

Ladder

Progression by round

Updated to match(es) played on 19 March 2023. Source: AFL Tables

Home matches and membership

Updated to match(es) played on 19 March 2023. Source: AFL Tables

Win/loss table
The following table can be sorted from biggest winning margin to biggest losing margin for each round. If two or more matches in a round are decided by the same margin, these margins are sorted by percentage (i.e. the lowest-scoring winning team is ranked highest and the lowest-scoring losing team is ranked lowest). Home matches are in bold, and opponents are listed above the margins.

Updated to match(es) played on 19 March 2023. Source: AFL Tables

Season notes
 The total round 1 attendance of 392,248 is the third-highest attendance for a round in VFL/AFL history.

Milestones

Updated to match(es) played on 19 March 2023. Source: AFL Tables

Leading goalkickers

! rowspan=2 style=width:2em | #
! rowspan=2 | Player
! rowspan=2 | Team
! colspan=24 | Home-and-away season (Coleman Medal)
! colspan=4 | Finals
! rowspan=2 | Total
! rowspan=2 | Games
! rowspan=2 | Average
|-
! 1 !! 2 !! 3 !! 4 !! 5 !! 6 !! 7 !! 8 !! 9 !! 10 !! 11 !! 12 !! 13 !! 14 !! 15 !! 16 !! 17 !! 18 !! 19 !! 20 !! 21 !! 22 !! 23 !! 24 !! F1 !! F2 !! F3 !! GF
|-
! scope=row style=text-align:center | 1
| align=left | Nick Larkey || align=left |  || bgcolor=C9F0FF | 66 ||  ||  ||  ||  ||  ||  ||  ||  ||  ||  ||  ||  ||  ||  ||  ||  ||  ||  ||  ||  ||  ||  ||  ||  ||  ||  ||  || 6 || 1 || 6.00
|-
! scope=row style=text-align:center rowspan=4 | 2
| align=left | Ben Brown || align=left |  || 44 ||  ||  ||  ||  ||  ||  ||  ||  ||  ||  ||  ||  ||  ||  ||  ||  ||  ||  ||  ||  ||  ||  ||  ||  ||  ||  ||  || 4 || 1 || 4.00
|-
| align=left | Toby Greene || align=left |  || 44 ||  ||  ||  ||  ||  ||  ||  ||  ||  ||  ||  ||  ||  ||  ||  ||  ||  ||  ||  ||  ||  ||  ||  ||  ||  ||  ||  || 4 || 1 || 4.00
|-
| align=left | Todd Marshall || align=left |  || 44 ||  ||  ||  ||  ||  ||  ||  ||  ||  ||  ||  ||  ||  ||  ||  ||  ||  ||  ||  ||  ||  ||  ||  ||  ||  ||  ||  || 4 || 1 || 4.00
|-
| align=left | Kysaiah Pickett || align=left |  || 44 ||  ||  ||  ||  ||  ||  ||  ||  ||  ||  ||  ||  ||  ||  ||  ||  ||  ||  ||  ||  ||  ||  ||  ||  ||  ||  ||  || 4 || 1 || 4.00
|}

Updated to the end of round 1. Source: AFL Tables

References

Sources
 2023 AFL season at afl.com.au

 2023 AFL season at AustralianFootball.com

2023 Australian Football League season
Australian Football League seasons
A